Shariff Kabunsuan's at-large congressional district was a short-lived congressional district that encompassed the entire province of Shariff Kabunsuan in the Philippines. It was created ahead of the 2007 Philippine House of Representatives elections following the passage of Muslim Mindanao Autonomy Act No. 201 on September 6, 2006 and its subsequent ratification by the 2006 Shariff Kabunsuan creation plebiscite. The province of Shariff Kabunsuan, now defunct, covered the whole territory of Maguindanao's 1st congressional district including Cotabato City. It elected Didagen P. Dilangalen of the Pwersa ng Masang Pilipino (PMP) as its first and only representative with the district having been made obsolete by the 2008 Supreme Court decision nullifying the new province and reverting its territory to the province of Maguindanao.

Representation history

See also
Legislative districts of Maguindanao

References

Former congressional districts of the Philippines
2006 establishments in the Philippines
2008 disestablishments in the Philippines
At-large congressional districts of the Philippines
Congressional districts of Bangsamoro
Constituencies established in 2006
Constituencies established in 2008